New Town is a village in the Jomoro district, a district in the Western Region of Ghana, adjacent to the border with Ivory Coast. The major highway that runs through the village is Half Assini - New Town Rd.

External links and sources

 New Town (Ghana)

Populated places in Jomoro Municipal District